Ralph Wallace was a Texas politician.

Ralph Wallace may also refer to:

 Ralph W. Wallace, member of the California legislature

See also
Ralph Wallis (died 1669), nonconformist pamphleteer
 Ralph Wallace Burton (1905–1983), Ottawa Valley artist